Hayward Medical Communications was a division of Hayward Group Limited. It was a UK-based medical communications agency and publisher, with offices in London and Newmarket.

Founded in 1991, Hayward Medical Communications had a portfolio of journals targeted at healthcare professionals and patients. The company also published multimedia products and services for the pharmaceutical industry, as well as for government agencies, charities and non-governmental organisations. Its services include consultancy, programme planning, professional training and health technology assessment submissions to the NHS agencies:  the National Institute for Health and Clinical Excellence, the Scottish Medicines Consortium, and the All Wales Medicines Strategy Group.

Hayward Medical Communications was acquired by Prescript Communications in 2019. As of August 2022 its website directs viewers to Prescript.

Publications
ADHD in practice
British Journal of Renal Medicine
 British Journal of Sexual Medicine
Dermatology in practice
European Journal of Palliative Care
Managing pain in practice
Myeloid disorders in practice
Respiratory disease in practice
Rheumatology in practice
Thrombus
Vaccines in practice
Viral hepatitis in practice

External links
 Company website
 Journals portal

References

Publishing companies of England
Publishing companies established in 1991
Medical magazines
1991 establishments in England
Publishing companies disestablished in 2019
2019 disestablishments in England
2019 mergers and acquisitions